Nick Mulvey (born 24 March 1993 in Harlow) is an English professional squash player. As of February 2018, he was ranked number 163 in the world.

References

1993 births
Living people
English male squash players